Colleretto Giacosa is a comune (municipality) in the Metropolitan City of Turin in the Italian region Piedmont, located about  north of Turin.

Colleretto Giacosa borders the following municipalities: Samone, Loranzè, Pavone Canavese, Parella, and San Martino Canavese.

The poet, playwright and librettist Giuseppe Giacosa (1847 – 1906) was born in the then Colleretto Parella, the town changed its name after him.

References

Canavese